Daniele Contrini (born 15 August 1974, in Gardone Val Trompia) is an Italian racing cyclist. His major victory was the 2nd stage in the 2006 Tour de Suisse in Einsiedeln.

Palmares 

 Tour of Georgia - 1 stage (2007)
 Tour de Suisse - 1 stage (2006)
 Route Adelié (2005)
 Tour de Picardie - 1 stage (2005)
 Sachsen Tour - 1 stage (2003)
 National Time Trial Championship
 2nd (2000)
 3rd (2001)
 GP KRKA (1998)
 Four Days of Dunkirk
 1 stage & 3rd Final (1997)
 Mountains Classification (2000)
 Olympia's Tour - 1 stage (1997)
 European Road U23 Championship - 2nd (1996)

References

1974 births
Living people
Italian male cyclists
Tour de Suisse stage winners
Cyclists from the Province of Brescia